Airjet Exploração Aerea de Carga (a.k.a. Airjet) is an airline based in Angola. It was established in 2003 and operates 12  aircraft. Airjet joined the JetVision Holdings (South Africa) on 1 May 2019 as an airline partner. Airjet's head offices are located in Luanda, Angola and Pretoria, South Africa.

Fleet
The Airjet fleet consists of the following aircraft (at October 2021):

See also
 List of airlines of Angola

References

External links
 http://www.jetvisionairways.com

Airlines of Angola
Airlines established in 2003